Lauri Pilter (also known as Larats Pilter; born 15 October 1971 in Tallinn) is an Estonian writer, translator and literary scientist.

Lauri Pilter won the Friedebert Tuglas award for literature in 2004 for his short story "The Double", and the Betti Alver award for the best first novel for his work Lohejas pilv (A Dragonish Cloud).

A PhD student at Tartu University, Pilter's Master's thesis, "Southern Gothic: The Development of the Depiction of Violence and Spiritual Degeneration in the Works of William Faulkner and Cormac McCarthy" was also at Tartu University in 2004.

His translations into Estonian include two novels by Philip Roth, The Border Trilogy by Cormac McCarthy, the chapter "Waiting for Glory" from the novel The Web and the Rock and the novella The Lost Boy by Thomas Wolfe, and Life on the Mississippi by Mark Twain.

External links
Fridebert Tuglas Short Story Award Winners
Photo of Lauri Pilter

References
 Estonian Literary Magazine Spring 2005, Number 20 Lauri Pilter: Representative of a Nameless Minority by Lauri Pilter, Argo Riistan
Master's thesis
Estonian Humanities Institute
Estonian Literature Information Center 2004 Betti Alver Award
Betti Alver Award winners
Biography of Lauri Pilter

1971 births
Living people
Estonian male short story writers
Estonian male novelists
Estonian translators
University of Tartu alumni
Writers from Tallinn
21st-century Estonian novelists
21st-century translators